Daniel Joseph Nadler is a Canadian-born technology entrepreneur, artist, and poet. He is the co-founder of Kensho Technologies, which, according to Forbes, became the most valuable privately owned artificial intelligence company in history when it was acquired by S&P Global for $550 million in 2018.

Education 
Nadler received a Ph.D. from Harvard University in 2016; his doctoral thesis involved new econometric and statistical approaches to modeling low probability, high impact events.

During his academic career Nadler held a fellowship at Harvard's Mind/Brain/Behavior Initiative and served as a Research Director at Stanford University's School of Engineering.

Career

Kensho Technologies 
In 2013, while still a Ph.D. student at Harvard University, Nadler co-founded Kensho Technologies, an artificial intelligence company that developed machine learning systems. In 2017, at Davos, Kensho was named by the World Economic Forum as "one of most innovative and impactful technology companies in the world". In 2018 Kensho became, according to Forbes, the most valuable privately owned artificial intelligence company in history when it was acquired by S&P Global for $550 million in 2018.

In 2016 and 2017 Nadler was recognized as a Technology Pioneer at the World Economic Forum in Davos.

XYLA 
In 2021 Nadler founded Xyla, an artificial intelligence company developing AI systems that can read, write, synthesize, and reason about complex and specialized knowledge, such as science, medicine and engineering.

Other activities 
Since 2020, Nadler has served on the Digital Art Committee of the Whitney Museum.

In 2021, Nadler was elected to the Board of Directors of the Museum of Modern Art PS1 (MoMA PS1).

Poetry 

At Harvard University Nadler studied with Pulitzer Prize winning poet Jorie Graham while completing his Ph.D. in statistical and mathematical fields. Nadler's debut collection of poetry, Lacunae: 100 Imagined Ancient Love Poems, was published by Farrar, Straus and Giroux in 2016 and was named a Best Book of the Year by NPR.

In 2018 Nadler was elected to the board of directors of the Academy of American Poets, becoming the youngest person ever to be elected to the Academy's Board in its 85-year history.

Film 

In 2018 Nadler co-financed and served as executive producer on Motherless Brooklyn, a crime drama film written, produced and directed by Edward Norton based on the 1999 novel of the same name by Jonathan Lethem. Norton also stars in the film, along with Willem Dafoe, Bruce Willis, and Alec Baldwin. The film premiered at the 2019 Telluride Film Festival, as well as the 2019 Toronto International Film Festival, and was selected as the closing film of the 2019 New York Film Festival. In 2019 Nadler co-financed and served as producer on the upcoming drama Palmer, starring Justin Timberlake, which is slated for release in 2020.

References

1983 births
Living people
Businesspeople from Toronto
Canadian male poets
Canadian technology company founders
Harvard University alumni
Writers from Toronto
21st-century Canadian businesspeople
21st-century Canadian poets